Leiden Classical was a volunteer computing project run by the Theoretical Chemistry Department of the Leiden Institute of Chemistry at Leiden University.  Leiden Classical used the BOINC system, and enabled scientists or science students to submit their own test simulations of various molecules and atoms in a classical mechanics environment. ClassicalDynamics is a program (and with it a library) completely written in C++. The library is covered by the LGPL license and the main program is covered by the GPL. The project shut down on June 5, 2018.

Joining the project
Participation was possible via the BOINC manager.  Using this software one was once able to create an account in the project.  Then someone can make a model of a dynamic system and simulation participating run. There are several models possible, to interactions between molecules or planets.

User Submitted Calculations
To create a personal calculation, a user's model had to have six defined variables:
Colors of the molecules
Box in which the model is run
Number of particles in the simulation
Interaction between the particles
Gravity
Coulomb force
Lennard-Jones interaction
Morse interaction
Rydberg interaction
Harmonic spirit
Harmonic bending
Recurrent torsion interactions
Distance conditions
Confirmation parameter(s)

See also
List of volunteer computing projects

References

External links
Leiden Classical website archive
Leiden Classical forum archive

Science in society
Free science software
Volunteer computing projects